Tanveer Ahmed may also refer to:

Tanveer Ahmed (footballer) (born 1976), Pakistani footballer
Tanveer Ahmed (boxer) (born 1968), Pakistani boxer
Tanveer Ahmed (cricketer) (born 1997), Hong Kong cricketer
Tanveer Ahmed (psychiatrist) (born 1974), Australian psychiatrist and television personality
Tanveer Ahmed, Sunni Muslim convicted of the religiously motivated hate killing of Asad Shah in Glasgow, Scotland

See also
Tanvir Ahmed (born 1978), Pakistani Test cricketer
Tanvir Ahmed (cricketer, born 1963), Pakistani domestic cricketer
Tanvir Ahmed (umpire), (born 1972), Bangladesh cricket umpire